Paul Glover (born 1972) is a New Zealand actor. He appeared in more than thirty films since 1993.

Selected filmography

References

External links 

1972 births
Living people
New Zealand male film actors